Alexander Irvine Hannan (13 February 1916 – 31 March 2002) was a South African boxer who competed in the 1936 Summer Olympics.

He was born in Glasgow, Scotland.

In 1936 he was eliminated in the quarterfinals of the bantamweight class after losing his fight to the upcoming bronze medalist Fidel Ortiz of Mexico.

1936 Olympic results
Below is the record of Alec Hannan, a South African bantamweight boxer who competed at the 1936 Berlin Olympics:

 Round of 32: defeated Veikko Huuskonen (Finland) on points
 Round of 16: defeated Antoni Czortek (Poland) on points
 Quarterfinal: lost to Fidel Ortiz (Mexico) on points

External links
profile

1916 births
2002 deaths
Boxers from Glasgow
Scottish emigrants to South Africa
Bantamweight boxers
Olympic boxers of South Africa
Boxers at the 1936 Summer Olympics
South African male boxers